Banksia catoglypta is a species of shrub that is endemic to Western Australia. It has pinnatisect leaves with sharply-pointed, triangular lobes and heads of golden brown and cream-coloured flowers.

Distribution and habitat
The stems have characteristic, prominent egg-shaped to oval bracts at the base of each new year's growth. The flowers are arranged in groups of between 85 and 110 in each head on the end of a short branchlet.

Taxonomy and naming
This species was first formally described in 1996 by Alex George in the journal Nuytsia and given the name Dryandra catoglypta. The spe

cific epithet (catoglypta) is derived from ancient Greek words meaning "downwards" and "carved", referring to the bracts on the stem. In 2007 Austin Mast and Kevin Thiele transferred all dryandras to the genus Banksia.

Distribution and habitat
This banksia grows on breakaways in kwongan on the Gairdner Range and north of Badgingarra in the Geraldton Sandplains biogeographic region.

Conservation status
Banksia catoglypta is classified as "not threatened" by the Western Australian Government Department of Parks and Wildlife.

References

catoglypta
Plants described in 1996
Endemic flora of Western Australia
Eudicots of Western Australia
Taxa named by Kevin Thiele